Andrew "Drew" Romig (born March 25, 1998) is an American soccer player who plays for Memphis 901 in the USL Championship.

Club career
Romig signed with United Soccer League club Richmond Kickers in 2014.

In 2016, Romig went to play college soccer at the University of North Carolina at Chapel Hill. In four seasons with the Tar Heels, Romig made 8 appearances.

During his time at college, Romig played in the USL PDL with Wilmington Hammerheads and San Francisco City.

In 2021, Romig played with USL League Two side South Georgia Tormenta 2.

On March 7, 2022, Romig signed with USL Championship club Memphis 901 ahead of their 2022 season.

References

External links

American soccer players
North Carolina Tar Heels men's soccer players
Richmond Kickers players
Soccer players from Virginia
USL Championship players
1998 births
Living people
People from Midlothian, Virginia
Association football goalkeepers
San Francisco City FC players
Wilmington Hammerheads FC players
USL League Two players
Memphis 901 FC players